The Shah Jahan Mosque (also known as Woking Mosque) in Oriental Road, Woking, England, is the first purpose-built mosque in the United Kingdom. It is a Grade I listed building.

The Mosque promotes understanding, peace and harmony through interfaith activities.

Construction

The Shah Jahan Mosque was built in 1889 by Hungarian-British Orientalist Gottlieb Wilhelm Leitner. It was partly funded by  Sultan Shah Jahan Begum of Bhopal, as a place for students at the Oriental Institute in Woking to worship. The mosque was designed by architect William Isaac Chambers (1847–1924) and built in Bath and Bargate stone. It was designed in a Persian-Saracenic Revival style, and has a dome, minarets, and a courtyard. The architecture was described by Pevsner Architectural Guides as "extraordinarily dignified".

The Oriental Institute, for the students of which the mosque was constructed, was founded by Leitner in 1881. He had purchased the former Royal Dramatic College building in Woking and established the Institute in order to promote oriental literature. It awarded degrees from the University of the Punjab in Lahore, Pakistan.

History 
The mosque became the first formal place of Islamic worship in England. Queen Victoria's British Indian employees and her British Indian secretary, Abdul Karim, used the mosque when the Queen visited Windsor Castle. A small number of dignitaries, students, and guests used the mosque until Leitner's death in 1899, following which the mosque closed.

Lahore Ahmadiyya Movement period 

The mosque fell into disuse between Leitner's death and 1913. The London Mosque fund (which was founded in 1910) created the Woking Mosque Trust on Wednesday 17 April 1912.  During that meeting it was agreed by all members that they were to take over the title deeds.  It was also unanimously agreed by the committee members that Leitner's son should be elected to the Woking mosque trust committee. The Woking Mosque, the Memorial House and related property was passed into the ownership of the Woking Mosque Trust by a document of Indenture dated 12 April 1915

Khwaja Kamal-ud-Din's son Khwaja Nazir Ahmad gave credit to Mirza Sir Abbas Ali Baig for saving the mosque from being sold by the Leitner family for the purposes of a private factory.

Khwaja Kamal-ud-Din, a prominent Kashmiri lawyer was invited to become the Imam and help maintain the mosque.  He worked to repair and revive the mosque. The mosque was managed from 1914 to the mid-1960s by members of the Lahore Ahmadiyya Movement.

It attracted royal visitors and famous British converts, such as Lord Headley and Marmaduke Pickthall. During the First World War, the incumbent imam, Sadr-Ud-Din, petitioned the UK government to grant nearby land to the mosque as a burial ground for British Indian Muslim soldiers. By 1917, this burial ground had been constructed and received the bodies of 19 soldiers from the hospital for British Indian soldiers at Brighton Pavilion.

Until the arrival of Pakistani immigrants in the UK in the 1960s, the Shah Jahan Mosque was the centre of Islam in Britain. It was from the mosque that The Islamic Review was published, as well as Maulana Muhammad Ali's popular English translations of the Quran. It has also been claimed as the location at which the name 'Pakistan' was coined. Among those that visited the mosque in this time were Faisal of Saudi Arabia, Muhammad Ali Jinnah, Haile Selassie, Mir Yousuf Ali Khan, Aga Khan III, and Tunku Abdul Rahman.

Sunni period 
By the 1960s, the Ahmadi influence of the mosque had declined and it was seen more as a local mosque than vital to the practice of Islam in the UK. In the 1970s, it transferred into Sunni hands and was revived as an important place of worship in the community. The mosque was badly damaged in June 2016 after floods swamped homes in the surrounding area.

In fiction 
Chapter IX of HG Wells's The War of the Worlds, published in 1898, contains a description of the Mosque being damaged:About six in the evening, as I sat at tea with my wife in the summerhouse talking vigorously about the battle that was lowering upon us, I heard a muffled detonation from the common, and immediately after a gust of firing. Close on the heels of that came a violent rattling crash, quite close to us, that shook the ground; and, starting out upon the lawn, I saw the tops of the trees about the Oriental College burst into smoky red flame, and the tower of the little church beside it slide down into ruin. The pinnacle of the mosque had vanished, and the roof line of the college itself looked as if a hundred-ton gun had been at work upon it.

See also
 Woking Muslim Mission
 Khwaja Kamal-ud-Din
 Muslim Burial Ground, Horsell Common
 Mosque of the Bois de Vincennes

References

External links

Website: Shah Jahan Mosque
AAIIL: Woking Mosque and the Woking Muslim Mission
BBC: Forty Eight Hours – Tour: Woking Mosque (Photo of the Mosque in the 1900s)
British Muslim Heritage – London’s Mosques

1889 establishments in England
19th-century mosques
Grade I listed buildings in Surrey
Grade I listed religious buildings and structures
Indo-Islamic architecture
Mosques in England
Religious buildings and structures in Surrey
Religion in Surrey
Mosque buildings with domes
Mosques completed in 1889
Woking